The 1992 Puerto Rico Open was a women's tennis tournament played on outdoor hard courts at the San Juan Central Park in San Juan in Puerto Rico that was part of the Tier IV category of the 1992 WTA Tour. It was the 10th edition of the tournament and was held from October 26 through November 1, 1992. First-seeded Mary Pierce won the singles title and earned $27,000 first-prize money.

Finals

Singles
 Mary Pierce defeated  Gigi Fernández 6–1, 7–5
 It was Pierce's 3rd singles title of the year and the 4th of her career.

Doubles
 Amanda Coetzer /  Elna Reinach defeated  Gigi Fernández /  Kathy Rinaldi-Stunkel 6–2, 4–6, 6–2

References

External links
 ITF tournament edition details
 Tournament draws

Puerto Rico Open
Puerto Rico Open (tennis)
Puerto Rico Open, 1992